Abdilda (Tazhibayevich) Tazhibayev (Әбділдә Тәжібайұлы Тәжібаев, أبدئلدأ تأجئبايۇلى تأجئبايەۆ; , Abdilda Tazhibayevich Tazhibayev;  in Kyzyl-Orda – 1998, aged 89) was a Kazakh writer, screenwriter, and playwright. He was named a People's Writer of the Kazakh SSR in 1985.

Tazhibayev came from a literary family; his mother, Aimankul Tazhibaeva, also wrote in Kazakh. His son, Rustem Tazhibaev, is a film director.

References 

1909 births
1998 deaths
Kazakh-language writers
Kazakhstani dramatists and playwrights
20th-century dramatists and playwrights